The Russian census identified that there were more than 5,864,000 Ukrainians living in Russia  in 2015, representing over 4.01% of the total population of the Russian Federation and comprising the eighth-largest ethnic group. On 2022 February there were roughly 2.8 million Ukrainians fled and deported to Russia.

In February 2014, there were 2.6 million Ukrainian citizens in the territory of Russia, two-thirds of the labour migrants; however, after Russia annexed Crimea and the start of the War in Donbas, the number was estimated to have risen to 4.5 million

History

17th and 18th centuries 

147The Treaty of Pereyaslav of 1654 led to Ukraine becoming a protectorate of Tsarist Russia. This resulted in increased Ukrainian immigration to Russia, initially to Sloboda Ukraine but also to the Don lands and the area of the Volga river. There was a significant migration to Moscow, particularly by church activists, priests and monks, scholars and teachers, artists, translators, singers, and merchants. In 1652, twelve singers under the direction of Ternopolsky moved to Moscow, and thirteen graduates of the Kyiv-Mohyla Collegium moved to teach the Moscovite gentry. Many priests and church administrators migrated from Ukraine; in particular, Ukrainian clergy established the Andreyevsky Monastery, which influenced the Russian Orthodox Church, in particular the reform policies of Patriarch Nikon which led to the Old Believer Raskol (English: schism). The influence of Ukrainian clergy continued to grow, especially after 1686, when the Metropolia of Kyiv was transferred from the Patriarch of Constantinople to the Patriarch of Moscow.

After the abolishment of the Patriarch's chair by Peter I, Ukrainian Stephen Yavorsky became Metropolitan of Moscow, followed by Feofan Prokopovich. Five Ukrainians were metropolitans, and 70 of 127 bishops in Russia's Orthodox hierarchy were recent emigres from Kyiv. Students of the Kyiv-Mohyla Collegium began schools and seminaries in many Russian eparchies. By 1750, over 125 such institutions were opened, and their graduates practically controlled the Russian church, obtaining key posts through to the late 18th century. Under Prokopovich, the Russian Academy of Sciences was opened in 1724, which was chaired from 1746 by Ukrainian Kirill Razumovsky.

The Moscow court had a choir established in 1713 with 21 singers from Ukraine. The conductor for a period of time was A. Vedel. In 1741, 44 men, 33 women, and 55 girls were moved to St. Petersburg from Ukraine to sing and entertain. Composer Maksym Berezovsky also worked in St. Petersburg at the time. A significant Ukrainian presence was also seen in the Academy of Arts.

The Ukrainian presence in the Russian Army also grew significantly. The greatest influx happened after the Battle of Poltava in 1709. Large numbers of Ukrainians settled around St Petersburg and were employed in the building of the city.

A separate category of emigrants were those deported to Moscow by the Russian government for demonstrating anti-Russian sentiment. The deported were brought to Moscow initially for investigation, then exiled to Siberia, Arkhangelsk or the Solovetsky Islands. Among the deported were Ukrainian cossacks including D. Mhohohrishny, Ivan Samoylovych, and Petro Doroshenko. Others include all the family of hetman Ivan Mazepa, A. Vojnarovsky, and those in Mazepa's Cossack forces that returned to Russia. Some were imprisoned in exile for the rest of their lives, such as hetman Pavlo Polubotok, Pavlo Holovaty, P. Hloba and Petro Kalnyshevsky.

19th century 

Beginning in the 19th century, there was a continuous migration from Belarus, Ukraine and Northern Russia to settle the distant areas of the Russian Empire. The promise of free fertile land was an important factor for many peasants, who until 1861 lived under serfdom. In the colonization of the new lands, a significant contribution was made by ethnic Ukrainians. Initially Ukrainians colonised border territories in the Caucasus. Most of these settlers came from Left-bank Ukraine and Slobozhanshchyna and mainly settled in the Stavropol and Terek areas. Some compact areas of the Don, Volga, and Urals were also settled.

The Ukrainians created large settlements within Russia, becoming the majority in certain centres. They continued fostering their traditions, their language, and their architecture. Their village structure and administration differed somewhat from the Russian population that surrounded them. Where populations were mixed, Russification often took place. The size and geographical area of the Ukrainian settlements were first seen in the course of the Russian Empire Census of 1897, which noted language but not ethnicity. A total of 22,380,551 Ukrainian speakers were recorded, with 1,020,000 Ukrainians in European Russia and 209,000 in Asian Russia.

20th century

Formation of Ukrainian borders 

The first Russian Empire Census, conducted in 1897, gave statistics regarding language use in the Russian Empire according to the administrative borders. Extensive use of Little Russian (and in some cases dominance) was noted in the nine south-western Governorates and the Kuban Oblast. When the future borders of the Ukrainian state were marked, the results of the census were taken into consideration. As a result, the ethnographic borders of Ukraine in the 20th century were twice as large as the Cossack Hetmanate that had been incorporated into the Russian Empire in the 17th century.

Certain regions had mixed populations made up of both Ukrainian and Russian ethnicities, and various minorities. These included the territory of Sloboda and the Donbas. These territories were between Ukraine and Russia. This left a large community of ethnic Ukrainians on the Russian side of the border. The borders of the short-lived Ukrainian People's Republic were largely preserved by the Ukrainian SSR.

In the course of the mid-1920s administrative reforms, some territory initially under the Ukrainian SSR was ceded to the Russian SFSR, such as the Taganrog and Shakhty cities in the eastern Donbas. At the same time, the Ukrainian SSR gained several territories that were amalgamated into the Sumy Oblast in Sloboda region.

Ukrainian life in post-Soviet Russia 

The Ukrainian cultural renaissance in Russia began at the end of the 1980s, with the formation of the Slavutych Society in Moscow and the Ukrainian Cultural Centre named after T. Shevchenko in Leningrad (now Saint Petersburg).

In 1991, the  organized a conference in Kyiv with delegates from the various new Ukrainian community organizations of the Eastern Diaspora. By 1991, over 20 such organizations were in existence. By 1992, 600 organizations were registered in Russia alone. The congress helped to consolidate the efforts of these organizations. From 1992, regional congresses began to take place, organized by the Ukrainian organizations of Prymoria, Tyumen Oblast, Siberia and the Far East. In March 1992, the Union of Ukrainian organizations in Moscow was founded. The Union of Ukrainians in Russia was founded in May 1992.

The term "Eastern Diaspora" has been used since 1992 to describe Ukrainians living in the former USSR, as opposed to the Western Ukrainian Diaspora which was used until then to describe all Ukrainian diaspora outside the Union. The Eastern Diaspora is estimated to number approximately 6.8 million, while the Western Diaspora is estimated to number approximately 5 million.

In February 2009, about 3.5 million Ukrainian citizens were estimated to be working in the Russian Federation, particularly in Moscow and in the construction industry. According to Volodymyr Yelchenko, the Ambassador of Ukraine to the Russian Federation, there were no state schools in Russia with a program for teaching school subjects in the Ukrainian language as of August 2010; he considered "the correction of this situation" as one of his top priorities.

As of 2007, the number of Ukrainian illegal immigrants in Russia has been estimated as being between 3 and 11 million. Many Ukrainians in Russia have been viewed as illegal immigrants and criminals, and complain of racism. Some have compared this to how Mexicans are viewed in the United States.

In a 2011 poll, 49% of Ukrainians said that they had relatives living in Russia.

Events since 2014 
During and after the 2014 annexation of Crimea by Russia and the Russian military intervention in Ukraine, Ukrainians living in Russia complained of being labelled a "Banderite" (follower of Stepan Bandera), even when they are from parts of Ukraine where Stephan Bandera has no considerable support.

Starting from 2014, a number of Ukrainian activists and organisations were prosecuted in Russia based on political grounds. Some notable examples include the case of Oleg Sentsov, which was described by Amnesty International as a "Stalinist era trial", the closure of a Ukrainian library in Moscow and prosecution of the library staff, and a ban of Ukrainian organisations in Russia, such as Ukrainian World Congress.

, there were 2.6 million Ukrainians living in Russia, more than half of them "guest workers". A million more had arrived in the previous eighteen months (although critics have accused the FMS and media of circulating exaggerated figures). About 400,000 had applied for refugee status and almost 300,000 had asked for temporary residence status, with another 600,000 considered to be in breach of migration rules. By November 2017, there were 427,240 applicant asylum-seekers and refugees from Ukraine registered in Russia, over 185,000 of them having received temporary asylum, and fewer than 590 with refugee status. The refugees were from the territories of Donetsk People's Republic and Luhansk People's Republics taken over by pro-Russian separatists since the Russo-Ukrainian War. Most refugees have headed to rural areas in central Russia. Major destinations for Ukrainian migrants have included Karelia, Vorkuta, Magadan Oblast; oblasts such as Magadan and Yakutia are destinations of a government relocation program since the vast majority avoid big cities like Moscow and Saint Petersburg.

During the 2022 Russian invasion of Ukraine, an estimated 2.8 million Ukrainians had arrived in Russia as of September 2022; the UN Human Rights Office stated: "There have been credible allegations of forced transfers of unaccompanied children to Russian occupied territory, or to the Russian Federation itself."

Anti-Ukrainian sentiment 

Ukrainians in the Russian Federation represent the third-largest ethnic group after Russians and Tatars. In spite of their relatively high numbers, some Ukrainians in Russia complain of unfair treatment and anti-Ukrainian sentiment in the Russian Federation. In November 2010, the High Court of Russia cancelled registration of one of the biggest civic communities of the Ukrainian minority, the "Federal nation-cultural autonomy of the Ukrainians in Russia" (FNCAUR).

A survey, conducted by the independent Russian research centre Levada in February 2019, found that 77% of Ukrainians and 82% of Russians think positively of each other as people.

Religion 
The vast majority of Ukrainians in Russia are adherents of the Russian Orthodox Church. The Ukrainian clergy had an influential role on Russian Orthodoxy in the 17th and 18th centuries.

Recently, the growing economic migrant population from Galicia have had success in establishing a few Ukrainian Catholic churches, and there are several churches belonging to the Ukrainian Orthodox Church (Kyiv Patriarchate), where Patriarch Filaret agreed to accept breakaway groups that had been excommunicated by the Russian Orthodox Church for breaches of canon law. In 2002, some asserted that Russian bureaucracy imposed on religion has hampered the expansion of these two groups. According to the Ukrainian Greek Catholic Church, their denomination has only one church building in all of Russia.

Ukrainian population centres in Russia

Kuban 

The original Black Sea Cossacks colonised the Kuban region from 1792. Following the Caucasus War and the subsequent colonisation of the Circaucasus, the Black Sea Cossacks intermixed with other ethnic groups, including the indigenous Circassian population.

According to the 1897 census, 47.3% of the Kuban population (including extensive latter 19th-century non-Cossack migrants from both Ukraine and Russia) referred to their native language as Little Russian (the official term for the Ukrainian language), while 42.6% referred to their native language as Great Russian. Most of the cultural production in Kuban from the 1890s until 1914, such as plays, stories and music, were written in the Ukrainian language, and one of the first political parties in Kuban was the Ukrainian Revolutionary Party. During the Russian Civil War, the Kuban Cossack Rada formed a military alliance with the Ukrainian People's Republic and declared Ukrainian to be the official language of the Kuban National Republic. This decision was not supported uniformly by the Cossacks themselves, and soon the Rada itself was dissolved by the Russian White Denikin's Volunteer Army.

In the 1920s, a policy of Decossackization was pursued. At the same time, the Bolshevik authorities supported policies that promoted the Ukrainian language and self-identity, opening 700 Ukrainian-language schools and a Ukrainian department in the local university. Russian historians claim that Cossacks were in this way forcibly Ukrainized, while Ukrainian historians claim that Ukrainization in Kuban merely paralleled Ukrainization in Ukraine itself, where people were being taught in their native language. According to the 1926 census, there were nearly a million Ukrainians registered in the Kuban Okrug alone (or 62% of the total population). During this period many Soviet repressions were tested on the Cossack lands, particularly the Black Boards that led to the Soviet famine of 1932–1934 in the Kuban. Yet by the mid-1930s there was an abrupt policy change of Soviet attitude towards Ukrainians in Russia. In the Kuban, the Ukrainization policy was halted and reversed. In 1936 the Kuban Cossack Chorus was re-formed as were individual Cossack regiments in the Red Army. By the end of the 1930s many Cossacks' descendants chose to identify themselves as Russians. From that time onwards, almost all of the self-identified Ukrainians in the Kuban were non-Cossacks; the Soviet Census of 1989 showed that a total of 251,198 people in Krasnodar Kray (including Adyghe Autonomous Oblast) were born in the Ukrainian SSR. In the 2002 census, the number of people who identified as Ukrainians in the Kuban was recorded to be 151,788. Despite the fact that most of the descendants of Kuban Cossacks identify themselves as Russian nationals. Many elements of their culture originate from Ukraine, such as the Kuban Bandurist music, and the Balachka dialect.

Moscow 

Moscow has had a significant Ukrainian presence since the 17th century. The original Ukrainian settlement bordered Kitai-gorod.  No longer having a Ukrainian character, it is today is known as Maroseyka (a corruption of Malorusseyka, or Little Russian). During Soviet times the main street, Maroseyka, was named after the Ukrainian Cossack hetman Bohdan Khmelnytsky. After Moscow State University was founded in 1755, many students from Ukraine studied there. Many of these students had commenced their studies at the Kyiv-Mohyla Academy.

In the first years after the revolution of 1905, Moscow was one of the major centres of the Ukrainian movement for self-awareness. The monthly magazine Zoria (Зоря, English: Star) was edited by A. Krymsky, and from 1912 to 1917 the Ukrainian cultural and literary magazine Ukrainskaya zhizn was also published there (edited by Symon Petliura). Books in the Ukrainian language were published in Moscow from 1912 and Ukrainian theatrical troupes of M. Kropovnytsky and M. Sadovsky were constantly performing in Moscow.

Moscow's Ukrainians played an active role in opposing the attempted coup in August 1991.

According to the 2001 census, there are 253,644 Ukrainians living in the city of Moscow, making them the third-largest ethnic group in that city after Russians and Tatars. A further 147,808 Ukrainians live in the Moscow region. The Ukrainian community in Moscow operates a cultural centre on Arbat Street, whose head is appointed by the Ukrainian government. It publishes two Ukrainian-language newspapers and has organized Ukrainian-language Saturday and Sunday schools.

Saint Petersburg 
When Saint Petersburg was the capital during the Russian Empire era, it attracted people from many nations including Ukraine. The Ukrainian poets Taras Shevchenko and Dmytro Bortniansky spent most of their lives in Saint Petersburg. Ivan Mazepa, carrying out the orders of Peter I, was responsible for sending many Ukrainians to help build St Petersburg, where they died on a massive scale.

According to the 2001 census, there are 87,119 Ukrainians living in the city of St Petersburg, where they constitute the largest non-Russian ethnic group. The former mayor, Valentina Matviyenko (née Tyutina), was born in Khmelnytskyi Oblast of western Ukraine and is of Ukrainian ethnicity.

Zeleny Klyn 

Zeleny Klyn is often referred to as Zelena Ukraina. This is an area of land settled by Ukrainians which is a part of Far Eastern Siberia, located on the Amur River and the Pacific Ocean. It was named by Ukrainian settlers.
Ukrainians made up 26% of the population in 1926.  In the last Russian census, 94,058 people in Primorsky Krai claimed Ukrainian ethnicity, making Ukrainians the second-largest ethnic group and largest ethnic minority.

Siry Klyn 

The Ukrainian settlement of Siry Klyn, literally the "grey wedge", developed around the city of Omsk in western Siberia. M. Bondarenko, an emigrant from Poltava province, wrote before World War I: "The city of Omsk looks like a typical Moscovite city, but the bazaar and markets speak Ukrainian". All around the city of Omsk stood Ukrainian villages. The settlement of people beyond the Ural mountains began in the 1860s. There were attempts to form an autonomous Ukrainian region in 1917–1920. Altogether, 1,604,873 emigrants from Ukraine settled the area before 1914.  According to the 2010 Russian census, 77,884 people of the Omsk region identified themselves as Ukrainians, making Ukrainians the third-largest ethnic group there after Russians and Kazakhs.

Zholty Klyn 

The settlement of Zholty Klyn (the Yellow Wedge) was founded soon after the Treaty of Pereyaslav of 1659 as the eastern border of the second Zasechnaya Cherta. Named after the yellow steppes on the middle and lower Volga, the colony co-existed with the Volga Cossacks, and colonists primarily settled around the city of Saratov. In addition to Ukrainians, Volga Germans and Mordovians migrated to Zholty Klyn in large numbers.  most of the population is integrated throughout the region, though a few culturally Ukrainian villages remain.

Demographics

Statistics and scholarship 

Statistical information about Ukrainians is included in the census materials of the Russian Empire, the Soviet Union and the Russian Federation which were collected in 1897, 1920, 1923, 1926, 1937, 1939, 1959, 1970, 1979, 1989, 2002 and 2010. Of these, the 1937 census was discarded and begun again as the 1939 census.

In the aftermath of the breakup of the Soviet Union in 1991, attention has been focused on the Eastern Ukrainian diaspora by the Society for relations with Ukrainians outside of Ukraine. Numerous attempts have been made to unite them. The society publishes the journal Zoloti Vorota (Золоті ворота, named for The Golden Gate of Kyiv) and the magazine Ukrainian Diaspora.

Trends 

During the 1990s, the Ukrainian population in Russia noticeably decreased due to a number of factors. The most important one was the general population decline in Russia. At the same time, many economic migrants from Ukraine moved to Russia for better paid jobs and careers. It is estimated that there are as many as 300,000 legally registered migrants. There is negative sentiment toward the bulk of migrants from the Caucasus and Central Asia, with Ukrainians relatively trusted by the Russian population. Assimilation has also been a factor in the falling number of Ukrainians; many intermarry with Russians, due to cultural similarities, and their children are counted as Russian on the census. Otherwise, the Ukrainian population has mostly remained stable due to immigration from Ukraine.

Notable Ukrainians in Russia 

 Marina Ovsyannikova (Tkachuk) - journalist who was employed on the Channel One Russia TV channel
 Vasily Lanovoy, actor who worked in the Vakhtangov Theatre, was also known as the President of Artek Festival of Films for Children
 Pavel Sudoplatov, NKVD officer, lieutenant general of the MVD, who became involved in several famous episodes, including the assassination of Leon Trotsky in 1940, the Soviet espionage program which obtained information about the atomic bomb from the Manhattan Project, and Operation Scherhorn in 1944
 Bogdan Stashinsky, a former KGB officer and spy who assassinated the Ukrainian nationalist leaders Lev Rebet and Stepan Bandera in the late 1950s
 Vlad Lisovets - stylist, hair stylist, designer and host
 Semyon Tsvigun -officer of the Soviet security police (KGB) whose sudden and unexplained death heralded a major shift in Kremlin power politics.
 Viktor Medvedchuk – Ukrainian opposition politician. Born in Pochet, Krasnoyarsk Krai, Russian SFSR.Vladimir Putin is the godfather of Medvedchuk's daughter Daryna (born in 2004)
 Yury Kovalchuk - billionaire businessman and financier who is "reputed to be Vladimir Putin's personal banker"
 Gennady Timchenko - oligarch and billionaire businessman
 Elena Kostyuchenko - journalist and gay rights activist
 Sergey Tereshchenko – Prime Minister of Kazakhstan (1991–1994). He was born in an ethnic Ukrainian family in the town of Lesozavodsk, which was in the Primorsky Krai Region of the RSFSR
 Innocent of Irkutsk – missionary to Siberia and the first bishop of Irkutsk in Russia
 Joasaph of Belgorod – Russian Orthodox hierarch, bishop of Belgorod from 1748 until his death
 John of Tobolsk – Metropolitan of Tobolsk
 Saint John of Shanghai and San Francisco – prominent Eastern Orthodox ascetic and hierarch of the Russian Orthodox Church Outside Russia (ROCOR) who was active in the mid-20th century
 Arsenius (Matseyevich) – metropolitan of Rostov and Yaroslavl who protested against the confiscation of the church's land by Empress Catherine II in 1764
 Dimitry of Rostov – leading opponent of the Caesaropapist reform of the Russian Orthodox church promoted by Feofan Prokopovich.
 Ivan Zaporozhets – Soviet security officer and official of the OGPU-NKVD who was suspected of being involved in the assassination of Sergei Kirov in Leningrad in December 1934
 Roman Rudenko – Procurator General of the Soviet Union (1953–1981). He is well known internationally for acting as chief prosecutor for the USSR at the 1946 trial of the major Nazi war criminals in Nuremberg.
 Arkady Babchenko - print and television journalist
 Iona Nikitchenko – judge of the Supreme Court of the Soviet Union
 Oleksiy Alchevsky – entrepreneur, philanthropist, and industrialist of the Russian Empire. He was a pioneer in establishing the first finance group in Russia.
 Georgy Gapon, a Russian Orthodox priest and a popular working-class leader before the 1905 Russian Revolution
 Viktor Bout – arms dealer
 Stefan Yavorsky – archbishop and statesman in the Russian Empire and the first president of the Most Holy Synod
 Nina Kukharchuk-Khrushcheva – First Lady of USSR, the second wife of the Soviet leader Nikita Khrushchev
 Raisa Titarenko-Gorbacheva – First Lady of USSR, wife of Soviet leader Mikhail Gorbachev
 Vera Kholodnaya – star of Russian silent cinema
 Yelena Bondarchuk (half Ukrainian), Soviet actress
 Zhanna Prokhorenko, Soviet actress
 Klara Luchko, Soviet actress
 Valeriya Zaklunna – Soviet actress, People's Artist of Russia (22 May 2004)
 Pavel Pavlenko – Soviet stage and film actor
 Aleksandr Yatsenko – actor
 Artur Kirilenko – entrepreneur, between 1994 and 2010 was owner and director of Stroymontazh, one of the largest property development companies in St Petersburg, Russia. Honorary Builder of Russia.
 Viktor Pshonka – former Prosecutor General of Ukraine (from 4 November 2010 until 22 February 2014), State Counselor of Justice of Ukraine and member of the High Council of Justice of Ukraine
 Yuri Shvets – Major in the KGB between 1980 and 1990
 Victor Kostetskiy – Russian and Soviet actor
 Anna Kovalchuk - actress
 Miroslava Karpovich – actress and model
 Yaroslav Boyko – Russian actor of theatre and cinema.
 Aleksandr Tsekalo – musician, actor, radio and TV host. Founder of production company Sreda.
 Sergey Makovetsky – film and stage actor
 Ivan Koval-Samborsky – Stage and film actor.
 Sergei Garmash – Soviet and Russian film and stage actor, People's Artist of Russia
 Sergei Magnitsky – Ukrainian-born Russian tax advisor
 Dositheus (Ivanchenko) – bishop of the Russian Orthodox Church
 Nikita Dzhigurda – movie actor, singer, and cult media icon
 Allan Chumak - faith healer who came to prominence at the height of Gorbachev's Perestroika
 Aleksei Petrenko – Soviet and Russian film and stage actor
 Petro Prokopovych – founder of commercial beekeeping and the inventor of the first movable frame hive
 Viktor Petrik – businessman, claims to have made a number of scientific breakthroughs which he markets through his company
 Anatoly Savenko – Russian nationalist, social and political activist, lawyer, writer, essayist and journalist.
 Kirill Vyshinsky – journalist
 Alexander Borodai – journalist and entrepreneur, former separatist leader who was Prime Minister of the self-proclaimed Donetsk People's Republic in 2014
 Arkady Babchenko – print and television journalist
 Anatoly Lysenko – Soviet and Russian television figure, journalist, director, producer
 Dmitry Gerasimenko – businessman, ex-owner of steel company Krasny Oktyabr Closed Joint-Stock Company and of basketball clubs BC Krasny Oktyabr and Pallacanestro Cantù.
 Yuriy Kutsenko – actor, producer, singer, poet, and screenwriter
 Dmitriy Dyachenko - director, producer and screenwriter.
 Alexander Klimenko – former [Ukrainian] entrepreneur and politician, former Minister of Revenue and Duties of Ukraine
 Volodymyr Saldo - Ukrainian politician, Russian collaborator, alleged traitor and engineer serving as the de facto governor of Kherson Oblast since 26 April 2022 following his installation by the Russian military during the Russian occupation of Kherson Oblast
 Vladimir Ivanenko – founder of the first nongovernmental cable and essential television network in the USSR (1988); initiator and organizer of the first direct satellite broadcast from the territory of the former USSR (1994)
 Viktor Yanukovych, the fourth President of Ukraine
 Lyudmyla Nastenko-Yanukovych, former First Lady of Ukraine
 Viktor Yanukovych Jr, a Ukrainian politician and Member of Parliament
 Illia Kyva - Ukrainian politician,effectively defected to Russia by asking Russian president Vladimir Putin for a Russian passport (Russian citizenship) and political asylum
 Oleksandr Muzychko - Ukrainian political activist, a member of UNA-UNSO and coordinator of Right Sector in Western Ukraine.Was born near the Ural Mountains 

 Yury Dud – sports journalist and YouTuber, was editor-in-chief of Sports.ru

Culture 
 Nikolai Gogol – writer
 Pyotr Ilyich Tchaikovsky (quarter Zhaporizhian cossack) – composer
 Nikolai Ostrovsky – socialist realist writer
 Korney Chukovsky – poet
 Yevgeny Yevtushenko – poet
 Sergei Bondarchuk – film director
 Natalya Bondarchuk – film director
 Fyodor Bondarchuk – film director
 Alexander Dovzhenko – film director
 Leonid Gaidai – film director
 Anna Politkovskaya – journalist, writer, and human rights activist
 Taras Shevchenko – poet
 Vladimir Korolenko – writer
 Mikhail Zoshchenko – writer
 Vladimir Nemirovich-Danchenko – playwright and theatre administrator, one of the two founders of the Moscow Art Theatre
 Vasily Nemirovich-Danchenko – writer and a journalist
 Sergei Lukyanenko – science fiction and fantasy author
 Konstantin Paustovsky – writer
 Gregory Skovoroda – writer and philosopher
 Anna Netrebko -operatic soprano
 Arkady Averchenko – playwright and satirist
 Larisa Shepitko – film director, screenwriter and actress
 Grigory Chukhray – Soviet film director
 Pavel Chukhray – Soviet film director
 Les Kurbas – Soviet film director
 Konstantin Lopushansky – Soviet and Russian film director, film theorist and author
 Pavel Morozenko — Soviet theatre and film actor
 Yuri Moroz – Soviet and Russian film director, actor, scriptwriter, producer
 Andrei Kravchuk - television and film director and screenwriter
 David Burliuk – poet and painter, often described as "the father of Russian Futurism"
 Wladimir Burliuk – avant-garde artist, Cubo-futurist
 Theophan Prokopovich- Russian Imperial Orthodox theologian, writer, poet, mathematician, and philosopher
 Dmitry Levitsky – painter
 Vladimir Borovikovsky – painter
 Konstantin Kryzhitsky – landscape painter
 Boris Vladimirski – Soviet painter of the Socialist Realism school.
 Dmitry Bezperchy – painter
 Rufin Sudkovsky – painter
 Vladimir Orlovsky – painter
 Nikolai Pimonenco – painter
 Nikolai Yaroshenko – painter
 Alexander Litovchenko – painter
 Alexander Murashko – painter
 Anton Losenko - neoclassical painter and academician 
 Aleksandr Shevchenko – modernist painter and sculptor
 Sergey Solomko – painter, watercolorist, illustrator and designer
 Ivan Soshenko - painter
 Vasily Velichko – poet, playwright and publicist
 Ivan Savenko – painter, Honored Artist of the RSFSR
 Nikolay Samokish – painter
 Igor Savitsky – painter, archeologist and collector, especially of avant-garde art
 Grigori Zozulya – artist
 Ippolit Bogdanovich – Russian classicist author of light poetry,
 Yevgeny Grebyonka – romantic prose writer, poet, and philanthropist
 Vasily Kapnist – poet and playwright
 Igor Markevitch – avant-garde composer and conductor
 Yevhen Pluzhnyk – poet
 Vasily Stus – poet
 Daria Serenko - poet, curator and public artist
 Sergey Parkhomenko - publisher, journalist and political commentator
 Igor Savchenko – screenwriter and film director
 Ilia Lagutenko – musician
 Yuri Shevchuk – musician
 Yuri Klimenko – Soviet and Russian cinematographer and photographer
 Nikolai Gubenko – Soviet and Russian actor, film and theatre director, screenwriter, founder of the Community of Taganka Actors theatre.People's Artist of the RSFSR
 Fyodor Sologub – Symbolist poet, novelist, playwright and essayist
 Ivan Kozlovsky – lyric tenor, long-time teacher at the Moscow Conservatory
 Bohdan Dedyckiy – writer, poet and journalist
 Maxim Berezovsky – composer
 Grigory Alchevsky – composer
 Michał Czajkowski – writer
 Tomasz Padura – Romantic poet
 Grigory Danilevsky – writer, historical novelist, and Privy Councillor of Russia
 Yuri Klimenko – Soviet and Russian cinematographer and photographer
 Maryna and Serhiy Dyachenko - fantasy authors
 Vasily Narezhny – writer known for his satirical depiction of provincial mores in the vein of the 18th-century picaresque novel
 Ruslan Gorobets – music composer, singer and arranger
 Nikolay Shcherbina – poet
 Klym  Polishchuk - journalist, poet and writer
 Yury Koval – author, artist, and screenplay writer
 Aleksei Bibik – one of the first working-class novelists
 Valentin Pikul- Soviet historical novelist
 Oleg Kulik – performance artist, sculptor, photographer and curator
 Anatoly Polyanski – architect
 Ivan Martos - Ukrainian and Russian sculptor and art teacher who helped awaken Russian interest in Neoclassical sculpture
 Alexander Vertinsky – artist, poet, singer, composer, cabaret artist and actor
 Serhii Vasylkivsky – artist
 Panteleimon Kulish – writer, critic, poet, folklorist, and translator
 Yevgeny Titarenko – writer
 Nikolai Gritsenko - theater and film actor
 Grigory Pasko -military journalist
 Viktor Kosenko – composer, pianist, and educator
 Aleksandr Shevchenko modernist painter and sculptor
 Alexandra Strelchenko – actress and singer, performer of Russian folk songs, Russian romances and pop songs, People's Artist of the RSFSR
 Klavdiya Shulzhenko – Soviet popular female singer and actress
 Alexandra Snezhko-Blotskaya – Soviet animated film director
 Lyudmila Gurchenko – popular Soviet and Russian actress, singer and entertainer. People's Artist of the USSR (1983)
 Viktor Klimenko – singer
 Darya Antonyuk - singer
 Yevgeny Kibkalo - baritone and a People's Artist of the RSFSR
 Viktor Merezhko – screenwriter, film director, playwright, actor, writer, TV presenter, People's Artist of the Russian Federation (2014)
 Oleg Karavaychuk – Soviet and Russian composer, author of music for many films and theater performances
 Anastasia Stotskaya – singer
 Arkady Ukupnik – composer, pop singer, actor, and producer
 Bogdan Titomir – musician, rapper and DJ, who began his career in a popular 1990s duo Car-Man
 Sogdiana Fedorinskaya – singer and actress
 Boris Slutsky – poet
 Alexander Gnylytsky – artist
 Tetyana Yablonska – painter
 Illya Chichkan – artist
 Vitaly Korotich – writer and journalist
 Pamfil Yurkevich – idealist philosopher and teacher
 Nikolay Gnedich – poet and translator
 Natalia Dudinskaya – prima ballerina who dominated the Kirov Ballet from the 1930s through the 1950s
 Svetlana Loboda – singer and composer.
 Natasha Korolyova (Porivay) – singer
 Vera Brezhneva (Halushka) – singer
 Anastasia Prikhodko – singer, represented Russia in the Eurovision Song Contest 2009 in Moscow
 Regina Todorenko – pop-singer and television presenter, member of the Russian show "Voice"
 Alexander Archipenko – avant-garde artist, sculptor, and graphic artist
 Marian Peretyatkovich – architect
 Andrey Kovalchuk - sculptor.
 Natalia Ermolenko-Yuzhina – opera singer (soprano)
 Nicolai Ivanovich Kravchenko – battle painter, journalist and writer
 Pyotr Leshchenko – singer, universally considered to be "the King of Russian Tango"
 Olga Peretyatko – operatic soprano
 Vladimir Bortko – film director
 Alla Horska – monumentalist painter, one of the first representatives of the underground art movement
 Mykhailo Boychuk – painter, most commonly known as a monumentalist
 Igor Krutoy – music composer, performer, producer and musical promoter
 Mikhail Gulko – author and performer of Russian chanson
 Bela Rudenko – opera singer, music teacher, and professor of the Moscow Conservatory
 Ignaty Potapenko – writer and playwright.
 Vladimir Khotinenko – film director
 Igor Matvienko - producer, composer, founder of the bands Lyube, Ivanushki International, Korni, Fabrika, KuBa
 Lolita Milyavskaya – singer, actress, TV and film director
 Yolka – singer
 Sergey Dorenko – Russian TV and radio journalist, known for hosting a weekly news commentary program in 1999–2000
 Vera Kamsha – author of high fantasy and a journalist.
 Andrey Kavun – film director and screenwriter
 Roman Viktyuk – theatre director, actor, and screenwriter

Sports 

 Vladimir Kramnik – chess grandmaster, the Classical World Chess Champion from 2000 to 2006, and the undisputed World Chess Champion from 2006 to 2007. He has won three team gold medals and three individual medals at Chess Olympiads.
 Alexander Grischuk - chess grandmaster, Russian champion (2009), three-time world blitz chess champion (in 2006, 2012 and 2015).
 Alexandra Kosteniuk - chess grandmaster who was Women's World Chess Champion from 2008 to 2010. She was European women's champion in 2004 and a two-time Russian Women's Chess Champion (in 2005 and 2016)
 Lyudmila Rudenko – Soviet chess player and the second women's world chess champion, from 1950 until 1953; was awarded the FIDE titles of International Master (IM) and Woman International Master (WIM) in 1950, and Woman Grandmaster (WGM) in 1976. She was the first woman awarded the International Master title.
 Natalia Titorenko – chess player who hold the FIDE title of Woman International Master (1982)
 Ekaterina Lagno – Russian (since 2014) chess grandmaster, Women's Vice World Champion in 2018, Women's World Rapid Champion in 2014 and Women's World Blitz Champion in 2010, 2018 and 2019.
 Andrey Esipenko - chess grandmaster. He won the European U10 Chess Championship in 2012, and both the European U16 and World U16 Chess Championship in 2017.
 Nikolay Davydenko – tennis player
 Vladislav Tretiak – ice hockey goaltender; 3 time Olympic gold medallist; 10 time world champion; considered one of the greatest of all time.
 Ilya Kovalchuk - ice hockey player
 Pavel Datsyuk - professional ice hockey player who is currently an unrestricted free agent
 Alexei Zhitnik – ice hockey defenceman; has played more games in the National Hockey League (NHL) (1,085) than any other Soviet-born defenceman.
 Daniil Sobchenko – ice hockey player; was the member of the Russian national team that competed in the IIHF World Championship's under 18 and under 20 levels; winning gold for the country in 2011.
 Vitaly Anikeyenko – ice hockey player
 Alexey Marchenko - professional ice hockey defenceman who currently plays for Lokomotiv Yaroslavl in the Kontinental Hockey League (KHL)
 Alexei Tereshchenko - professional ice hockey forward, who is currently an unrestricted free agent, he most recently played for Avangard Omsk of the Kontinental Hockey League (KHL).
 Vladimir Tarasenko - professional ice hockey right winger and alternate captain for the St. Louis Blues of the National Hockey League (NHL)
 Ignat Zemchenko – professional ice hockey player currently playing with HC Yugra in the Supreme Hockey League (VHL)
 Denis Shvidki – former professional ice hockey right wing
 Dmitri Khristich – ice hockey player
 Anton But – former professional ice hockey winger
 Oleg Tverdovsky – ice hockey defenceman
 Vitaly Vishnevskiy – former professional ice hockey defenceman. He previously played in the National Hockey League for the Mighty Ducks of Anaheim, Atlanta Thrashers, Nashville Predators, and New Jersey Devils, as well as for Lokomotiv Yaroslavl, SKA St. Petersburg and Severstal Cherepovets in the KHL.
 Alexander Komaristy – ice hockey centre who plays for HC Dinamo Saint Petersburg in the Supreme Hockey League (VHL)
 Andrei Nikolishin – ice hockey player; Olympic Bronze medal winner
 Anton Babchuk – ice hockey defenceman
 Kostiantyn Kasianchuk – ice hockey player
 Anatoliy Tymoshchuk – football coach and a former midfielder, currently an assistant coach of the Russian Premier League club Zenit Saint Petersburg
 Vladimir Kuts – Soviet long-distance runner, who won the 5000 and 10000 m races at the 1956 Olympics, setting Olympic records in both events
 Ivan Poddubny – professional wrestler from the Russian Empire and later the Soviet Union
 Olga Dvirna – female middle-distance runner who represented the Soviet Union in the late 1970s and early 1980s
 Anton Shvets – footballer who plays for Akhmat Grozny, as a central midfielder, represents the Russia national football team internationally
 Oleg Salenko – soccer player
 Artem Dzyuba – Ukrainian-born Russian soccer player, whose father is Ukrainian.
 Aleksei Miranchuk and Anton Miranchuk – twin Russian soccer players of Ukrainian origin from Kuban.
 Yaroslav Rakitskyi – footballer currently playing as a defender for Russian club FC Zenit Saint Petersburg
 Vladislav Ternavsky – football coach and former player
 Anatoliy Byshovets -Soviet and Russian football manager and former Soviet international striker
 Sergei Semak – football manager and a former international midfielder who is currently the manager of Zenit St. Petersburg
 Alexey Oleynik – mixed martial artist and combat sambo fighter currently signed with the Ultimate Fighting Championship, competing in their heavyweight division.
 Anna Pogorilaya – figure skater
 Irina Poltoratskaya – Russian team handball player, playing on the Russian women's national handball team.
 Tatyana Navka – former competitive ice dancer
 Olga Sherbak – handball player who plays for HC Lada
 Oksana Grishuk – former competitive ice dancer.
 Elena Riabchuk – former pair skater
 Aleksei Kalashnik — professional football player
 Valentin Moldavsky – Russian (since 2014) combat sambo and mixed martial arts practitioner, World and European Champion in +100 kg.
 Dmitry Pashytsky – volleyball player, member of the Russian club Zenit Saint Petersburg, Estonian Champion (2011), Russian Champion (2019).
 Irina Zhuk – ice dancing coach and a former competitor for the Soviet Union
 Maria Stavitskaia – former competitive figure skater
 Leonid Zhabotynsky – weightlifter who set 19 world records in the superheavyweight class, and won gold medals at the 1964 and 1968 Olympic Games
 Sergei Makarenko – retired Soviet sprint canoeist who competed from late 1950s to early 1960s
 Anatoli Yevtushenko – Honored coach of the USSR (handball)
 Aleksandr Kovalenko – retired USSR triple jumper who won the bronze medal at the 1988 Summer Olympics
 Vladimir Yashchenko – member of the Soviet national team and former world record holder in the high jump (233 cm, 234 cm and 235 cm).
 Tetyana Hlushchenko – former Soviethandball player who competed in the 1976 Summer Olympics
 Tetyana Kozyrenko – footballer, who plays for Lokomotiv Moscow in the Women's Football League
 Nataliya Zinchenko – football player who currently acts as manager for Zvezda Perm
 Artem Klimenko – professional basketball player
 Viktor Vashchenko – former professional footballer
 Sergey Kovalenko - Soviet basketball player who won the gold medal with the Soviet basketball team in the 1972 Olympics. He played for CSKA Moscow (1976–1980)
 Iryna Chunykhovska – former sailor, who competed for the Soviet Union
 Larysa Moskalenko – former sailor, who competed for the Soviet Union
 Kostyantyn Parkhomenko – football player who last played for FC Sakhalin Yuzhno-Sakhalinsk
 Igor Gamula – professional football coach and a former player. He works as a scout for FC Rostov. He made his debut in the Soviet Top League in 1978 for FC Zaria Voroshilovgrad.
 Anatoli Polivoda - basketball player who played for the Soviet Union
 Igor Pedan – strongman who is best known for competing in the IFSA Strongman World Championships and World's Strongest Man
 Victor Khryapa – former professional basketball player who last played for CSKA Moscow of the VTB United League
 Ilya Tsymbalar – football player and coach
 Sergei Yuran – professional football manager and a former player. He is the manager of SKA-Khabarovsk.
 Vasil Yakusha – Soviet rower who competed for the Soviet Union in the 1980 Summer Olympics and in the 1988 Summer Olympics.
 Oleksandr Marchenko – Soviet rower. He and his partner, who won the bronze medal for the Soviet Union in the double sculls competition at the 1988 Summer Olympics.
 Ivan Edeshko - professional basketball player and coach.
 Aleksandr Sobko – former football player
 Valeri Popenchenko - Soviet boxer who competed in the middleweight division (−75 kg)
 Boris Butenko – Soviet athlete, who competed in the men's discus throw at the 1952 Summer Olympics
 Andriy Tishchenko – Soviet former rower who competed for the Soviet Union in the 1980 Summer Olympics
 Igor Kornienko – former professional tennis player
 Bogdan Aleshchenko – former football midfielder.
 Aleksandr Andryushchenko – professional football coach and a former player who currently works as a sports department manager for FC Rostov
 Gennadi Avramenko – Soviet sport shooter
 Volodymyr Herashchenko – Soviet professional football coach and a former player.
 Aleksandr Pavlenko – football official and a former player
 Sergey Kovalenko – Soviet basketball player who won the gold medal with the Soviet basketball team in the 1972 Olympics, played for CSKA Moscow (1976–1980)
 Oleg Stepko – Russian (since March 2018) gymnast
 Olha Huzenko – rower who competed for the Soviet Union in the 1976 Summer Olympics
 Viktor Maryenko – Soviet football player and coach
 Yevgeniy Zagorulko – high jump coach
 Antonina Rudenko – retired Soviet swimmer who won a gold medal in the  freestyle relay at the 1966 European Aquatics Championships, setting a new European record.
 Aleksandr Pavlenko – football official and a player, who plays as a central midfielder for FC Rodina Moscow
 Vadim Yaroshchuk – former butterfly and medley swimmer from the Soviet Union, who won two bronze medals at the 1988 Summer Olympics in Seoul, South Korea.
 Oleksiy Demyanyuk – high jumper, who set the world's best year performance in 1981 with a leap of 2.33 metres at a meet in Leningrad
 Dmitry Muserskiy – volleyball player, member of the Russia men's national volleyball team, 2012 Olympic Champion, 2013 European Champion, gold medallist of the 2011 World Cup and multiple World League medallist.
 Semyon Poltavskiy – volleyball player, who was a member of the men's national team that won the silver medal in both the 2005 and 2007 European Championships, was named Most Valuable Player in the latter tournament
 Liliya Osadchaya – former Soviet volleyball player, who won a silver medal at the 1976 Summer Olympics
 Andrei Karyaka – Russian football coach and a former player who played as a midfielder
 Sergei Mamchur – football defender.
 Viktor Miroshnichenko – boxer, represented the USSR at the 1980 Summer Olympics in Moscow, Soviet Union.
 Oleg Goncharenko – Distinguished Master of Sports of the USSR, was the first male Soviet speed skater to become World Allround Champion.
 Konstantin Yeryomenko – Russian futsal player who was named the greatest futsal player of the 20th century
 Dmitri Shkidchenko – figure skating coach and former pair skater who competed internationally for the Soviet Union.
 Olena Zubko – rower who competed for the Soviet Union in the 1976 Summer Olympics. In 1976 she was a crew member of the Soviet boat which won the silver medal in the eights event
 Viktor Budyansky – retired association footballer who played as a midfielder
 Oleh Leschynskyi – former Soviet professional football midfielder and Ukrainian (until 2014) and Russian (since 2014) coach
 Serhei Nahorny – Soviet sprint canoeist
 Tatiana Volosozhar – pair skater.
 Lesya Makhno – volleyball player, member of the Russian national team that won the gold medal at the 2010 World Championship.
 Yevgeniy Ivchenko – Soviet athlete who competed mainly in the 50 km walk
 Yuri Vlasenko – ice dancer.
 Vasyl Arkhypenko – Soviet athlete who competed mainly in the 400 metre hurdles
 Leonid Tkachenko – former Soviet player and the Ukrainian-Russian coach
 Maksim Tishchenko – Russian professional football coach and a former player
 Georgy Prokopenko – retired Soviet swimmer who competed at the 1960 and 1964 Summer Olympics
 Viktor Vashchenko – former professional footballer
 Vladislav Ignatenko – football player who plays for FC Nosta Novotroitsk
 Valentina Ivakhnenko – professional tennis player
 Serhiy Petrenko – retired sprint canoeist
 Liudmyla Avdieienko - athlete. She competed in the women's high jump at the 1988 Summer Olympics, representing the Soviet Union
 Sergey Shavlo – former Soviet footballer
 Aleksandr Shpakovsky – Soviet football player
 Viktor Onopko – football coach
 Andriy Demchenko – football coach and a former midfielder
 Darya Tkachenko – Russian (since 2016), draughts player holding the FMJD titles of FMJD Master (MF) and Women's International Grandmaster (GMIF). She is four-time women's world champion (2005, 2006, 2008, 2011) and twice women's European champion (2004, 2006) in international draughts.
 Anzhelika Shevchenko – Russian (since 2017) runner who specializes in the middle-distance running events
 Konstantin Bakun – [Ukrainian] volleyball player of [Russian] citizenship (since 2011), member of the Russia men's national volleyball team, Russian Champion (2020).
 Oleksandr Haydash – Russian (since 2014) professional football striker.
 Denys Holaydo – retired football midfielder
 Igor Dobrovolski – football manager and a former player
 Ilya Stefanovich – football player, plays as forward for FC Volgar Astrakhan
 Aleksey Sokirskiy – Russian(since 2015) hammer thrower
 Anastasia Shpilevaya – former competitive ice dancer
 Artyom Bezrodny – Russian association footballer
 Sergey Karetnik – football midfielder
 Andrey Fedoriv – former sprinter from the former Soviet Union, who specialised in the 200 metres
 Ivan Ordets – professional footballer who plays as a defender for Russian club Dynamo Moscow
 Olha Maslivets – windsurfer who has competed at four Olympic Games (2000, 2004, 2008 and 2012)
 Oleksandr Pomazun – former goalkeeper and a Russian football coach, goalkeepers coach with FC Khimik-Arsenal
 Oleg Goncharenko – Distinguished Master of Sports of the USSR, was the first male Soviet speed skater to become World Allround Champion.
 Yuri Doroshenko – professional football player
 Mykola Musiyenko – former triple jumper who represented the Soviet Union
 Vyacheslav Protsenko – professional football coach and a former player
 Anastasia Shlyakhovaya – female volleyball player
 Yuriy Prokhorenko – former pole vaulter who competed in the 1976 Summer Olympics and in the 1980 Summer Olympics
 Konstantin Yeryomenko – futsal player who was named the greatest futsal player of the 20th century
 Maksim Oberemko – Russian (since 2015) [windsurfer]
 Yury Starunsky – Soviet volleyball player who competed for the Soviet Union in the 1972 Summer Olympics and in the 1976 Summer Olympics
 Vladislav Zhovnirski – pair skating coach and former competitor.
 Nikolai Latysh – professional football coach, an assistant manager with FC Tobol
 Pavel Moroz – volleyball player, a member of Russia men's national volleyball team and Russian club Fakel Novy Urengoy
 Vera Rebrik – Russian(since 2015) track and field athlete who competes in the javelin throw
 Taras Khtey – volleyball player, a member of Russia men's national volleyball team.
 Aleksandr Bondar – Russian (since 2014) diver
 Tatiana Voitiuk – Soviet former ice dancer
 Serhiy Krasyuk – Soviet former swimmer, who won a gold and silver medal at the 1980 Summer Olympics in the 4 × 100 m medley and 4 × 200 m freestyle relays, respectively
 Anastasia Bliznyuk – group rhythmic gymnast
 Vera Moskalyuk – judoka
 Natalya Linichuk - ice dancing coach and former competitive ice dancer for the Soviet Union
 Lyudmyla Panchuk – Soviet  team handball player who competed in the 1976 Summer Olympics
 Borys Tereshchuk – Soviet former volleyball player who competed for the Soviet Union in the 1968 Summer Olympics
 Anatoliy Polishchuk – former volleyball player who competed for the Soviet Union in the 1976 Summer Olympics
 Roman Romanchuk – Russian (since 2000) amateur boxer
 Anatoliy Bondarchuk – retired Soviet hammer thrower, who is regarded as the most accomplished hammer throw coach of all time
 Viktor Mikhalchuk – former volleyball player who competed for the Soviet Union in the 1968 Summer Olympics
 Valery Kravchuk – retired Soviet heavyweight weightlifter
 Serhiy Kravchuk – Soviet fencer
 Artur Minchuk – Russian pair skating coach and former competitor.
 Borys Savchuk – Soviet sprinter, who competed in the men's 200 metres at the 1964 Summer Olympics representing the Soviet Union.
 Vitaly Mutko – former Minister of Sport of Russia

Science 

 Nicholas Miklouho-Maclay- explorer, ethnologist, anthropologist and biologist
 Gleb Lozino-Lozinskiy- lead developer of the Soviet Spiral and Shuttle Buran programme.
 Vladimir Vernadsky- mineralogist and geochemist
 George Vernadsky – historian
 Valentin Glushko – rocket scientist, a pioneer in rocket propulsion systems, and a major contributor to Soviet space and defense technology
 Trofim Lysenko- agronomist and biologist
 Theodosius Dobzhansky – [geneticist] and evolutionary biologist
 Mikhail Ostrogradsky – mathematician
 Anatoly Fomenko – mathematician, well known as a topologist, the author of a pseudoscientific theory known as New Chronology
 Anton Makarenko – one of the founders of Soviet pedagogy
 Vladimir Chelomey – mechanics scientist, aviation and missile engineer who invented the first Soviet pulse jet engine
 Vasyl Sukhomlynsky – humanistic educator in the Soviet Union who saw the aim of education in producing a truly humane being
 Boris Paton – Soviet mechanical scientist and engineer, famous for his works in electric welding
 Stephen Timoshenko – engineer and academician, considered to be the father of modern engineering mechanics
 Leonid Kulik – mineralogist who is noted for his research into meteorites
 Viktor Bunyakovsky – mathematician
 Yuri Lysianskyi – explorer
 George Kistiakowsky – physical chemistry professor
 Alexander Kistiakowsky – ornithologist and a specialist on bird lice
 Bogdan Kistyakovski – philosopher and social scientist
 Yuri Denisyuk – Soviet physicist, one of the founders of optical holography. He is known for his great contribution to holography, in particular for the so-called "Denisyuk hologram"
 Valentin Bliznyuk – aircraft designer, Chief Designer of the Tu-160
 Mikhail Kravchuk – mathematician
 Valery Kostuk – Russian scientist who has contributed to the development of processes for producing gases and cryogenic liquids
 Pyotr Kashchenko - psychiatrist, social and agrarian activist, author of articles on mental health and mental health services
 Oleg Gazenko - scientist, general officer in the Soviet Air Force and the former director of the Institute of Biomedical Problems in Moscow
 Alexander Zasyadko – Russian Imperial gunner and specialist in rocketry
 Praskov′ja Georgievna Parchomenko – Soviet astronomer who discovered many minor planets between the years of 1930–1940
 Valery Glivenko -mathematician
 Igor Simonenko – mathematician
 Sergei Brukhonenko – Soviet physician, biomedical scientist and technologist
 Yuri Nesterenko – mathematician
 Sergei Rudenko – prominent Soviet anthropologist and archaeologist who discovered and excavated the most celebrated of Scythian burials, Pazyryk in Siberia.
 Vladimir Lysenko – Russian academic
 Anatoly Babko – chemist
 Alexander Barchenko - biologist and researcher of anomalous phenomena from St. Petersburg
 Mariya Sergeyenko – Soviet scholar of Roman history and philologist
 Alexander Nikitenko – historian, censor, Professor of Saint Petersburg
University, and ordinary member of St. Petersburg Academy of Sciences
 Andrey Yevgenyevich Lichko - psychiatrist
 Fyodor Pirotsky – inventor of the world's first railway electrification system and electric tram
 Vladimir Podvysotsky – pathologist, endocrinologist, immunologist and microbiologist
 Amvrosy Metlinsky – poet, ethnographer, folklorist and panslavist
 Arkhip Lyulka – Soviet scientist and designer of jet engines, head of the OKB Lyulka, member of the USSR Academy of Sciences
 Nikolai Kibalchich – rocket pioneer
 Nikolai Zarudny – explorer and zoologist who studied the flora and fauna of Central Asia
 Pyotr Zinchenko – developmental psychologist
 Dmitri Ivanenko – theoretical physicist
 Nikolay Burdenko – Soviet surgeon, the founder of Russian neurosurgery
 Vladimir Nemoskalenko – physicist
 Vladimir Martynenko – sociologist, economist, and political scientist; Doctor of political sciences, Professor, Chief Scientific Officer, Institute of Socio-Political Studies under the Russian Academy of Sciences (ISPI RAN).
 Pyotr Yefimenko – ethnographer and historian
 Evgenia Kirichenko – historian of architecture and art
 Antonina Prikhot'ko – experimental physicist
 Konstantin Buteyko, the creator of the Buteyko method for the treatment of asthma and other breathing disorders
 Anatoly Kondratenko – theoretical physicist
 Evgeny Dobrenko - historian
 Vladimir Marchenko – mathematician
 Boris Evgenyevich Votchal – Academician of the USSR Academy of Medical Sciences (since 1969), Honored Scientist of the Russian Federation (1966), one of the founders of the clinical pharmacology in Russia
 Victor Linetsky – petroleum hydrogeologist
 Alexander Andreevich Samarskii – mathematician
 Vasily Omeliansky – microbiologist and author of the first original Russian text book on microbiology
 Yakub Holovatsky – historian
 Nikolay Dikansky – physicist
 Boris Struminsky – physicist known for his contribution to theoretical elementary particle physics
 Vadym Slyusar — founder of tensor-matrix theory of digital antenna arrays (DAAs), N-OFDM and other theories in fields of radar systems, smart antennas for wireless communications and digital beamforming
 Sergiy Vilkomir – computer scientist
 Yuri Kivshar – physist
 Stepan Kozhumyaka – engineer, bridge-builder and linguist
 Klyment Kvitka – musicologist and ethnographer
 Nikolay Gamaleya – Soviet physician and scientist who played a pioneering role in microbiology and vaccine research
 Vladimir Dybo – specialist in comparative historical linguistics and accentology
 Alexander Bogomolets – [pathophysiologist].
 Boris Grabovsky – one of the pioneers of television, invented the first fully electronic TV set (video transmitting tube and video receiver), which was demonstrated in 1928
 Lev Pisarzhevsky – chemist
 Sergei Winogradsky – microbiologist, ecologist and soil scientist who pioneered the cycle-of-life concept
 Yuri Linnik – Soviet mathematician active in number theory, probability theory and mathematical statistics
 Vladimir Lipsky – botanist
 Platon Poretsky -noted Russian Imperial astronomer, mathematician, and logician
 Daniil Zabolotny – epidemiologist and the founder of the world's first research department of epidemiology
 Oleksandr Harmash – Soviet scientist in the field of production line methods in construction (construction engineering)
 Fedir Vovk, anthropologist-archaeologist, the curator of the Alexander III Museum in St. Petersburg
 Evgeny Paton – Soviet mechanical scientist and engineer, famous for his works in electric welding
 Vladimir Betz – anatomist and histologist, famous for the discovery of giant pyramidal neurons of primary motor cortex
 Alexander Gorban – physicist and biologist
 Kirill Tolpygo – physicist
 Mikhail Fedoruk – rector of Novosibirsk State University, Doctor of Physics and Mathematics
 Aleksandr Markevich – zoologist, prolific helminthologist and copepodologist
 Mikhail Maksimovich – professor in plant biology
 Alexander Zaporozhets – Soviet developmental psychologist
 Zenon Ivanovich Borevich – mathematician
 Vladimir Pravdich-Neminsky – physiologist who published the first EEG and the evoked potential of the mammalian brain
 Mikhail Tugan-Baranovsky – economist
 Dmitry Grigorovich – Soviet aircraft designer
 Viktor Sadovnichiy – mathematician, winner of the 1989 USSR State Prize, and since 1992 he has been the rector of Moscow State University
 Osip Bodyansky – Slavist
 Pavlo Zhytetsky – linguist, philologist, ethnographer and literary historian, Doctor of Russian Literature (1908)
 Pavel Chubinsky – ethnographer and geographer
 Mikhail Grushevsky- historian
 Anatoly Kashpirovsky – psychotherapist, claimed to be a hypnotist and a psychic healer

Soviet/Russian politics 

 Alexander Bezborodko – Grand Chancellor of Russian Empire and chief architect of Catherine the Great's foreign policy
 Pyotr Zavadovsky – Russian Imperial statesman
 Dmitry Troshchinsky – senior Cabinet Secretary (1793–98), Prosecutor General (1814–17), Privy Councilor, senator, owner of the serf theater
 Andrey Razumovsky – Russian Imperial diplomat who spent many years of his life in Vienna
 Alexey Razumovsky – Acting Chamberlain (1775), Senator (1776–1807), Minister of Public Education (1810–1816). Active Privy Councillor (1807)
 Viktor Kochubey – Russian statesman and a close aide of Alexander I of Russia
 Pyotr Kapnist -Russian Imperial diplomat and ambassador to Austria (1895–1904)
 Mikhail Rodzianko – chamberlain of the Imperial family, Chairman of the State Duma and one of the leaders of the February Revolution of 1917
 Mikhail Tereshchenko – minister of Foreign Affairs of the Russian Provisional Government (1917)
 Vladimir Antonov-Ovseyenko – Bolshevik leader and diplomat, one of the leaders of the October revolution
 Pavel Dybenko – Bolshevik revolutionary, one of the leaders of the October revolution
 Alexandra Kollontai – revolutionary, politician, diplomat and Marxist theoretician. Serving as the People's Commissar for Welfare in 1917–1918, she was the first woman in history to become an official member of a governing cabinet.
 Nikolai Podvoisky – Bolshevik revolutionary and Soviet statesman, one of the leaders of the October revolution
 Stepan Petrichenko – anarcho-syndicalist politician, de facto leader of the Kronstadt Commune, and the leader of the revolutionary committee which led the Kronstadt rebellion of 1921.
 Dmitry Kursky – Prosecutor General of the Russian SFSR (1922–1928)
 Gleb Bokii – Bolshevik revolutionary, headed the "special department" of the Soviet secret police apparatus, believed to have been in charge of the Soviet Union's concentration camp system.
 Boris Shcherbina, a Soviet politician who served as a vice-chairman of the Council of Ministers from 1984 to 1989.Supervisor of Soviet crisis management during 1986 Chernobyl disaster and the 1988 Armenian earthquake.
 Grigory Petrovsky- Old Bolshevik, participated in signing the Treaty on the Creation of the USSR, one of the officials responsible for implementing Stalin's policies such as collectivization.
 Vsevolod Balitsky – Soviet official, Commissar of State Security 1st Class (equivalent to Four-star General) of the NKVD and a member of the Central Committee of the Communist Party of the Soviet Union
 Yakov Malik – Soviet diplomat, Soviet ambassador to the United Kingdom, known for giving the USSR justifications for the occupation of Czechoslovakia at the Security Council in August 1968
 Yuriy Kotsiubynsky – Bolshevik politician
 Vasily Shakhrai – political activist and Bolshevik revolutionary during the Russian Revolution, founder of what came to be called National Communism
 Dmitry Polyansky – Soviet-Russian statesman who was First Deputy Chairman of the Council of Ministers of the Soviet Union from 1965 to 1973. From 1958 to 1962 he was Chairman of the Council of Ministers of the Russian SFSR, equivalent to a Premier in of one of the 15 Soviet Socialist Republics that comprised the Soviet Union.
 Vladimir Matskevich – Deputy Chairman of the Soviet Council of Ministers;the Ambassador of the Soviet Union to Czechoslovakia
 Alexander Zasyadko – Soviet economic, state and party leader
 Semyon Sereda – Peoples's Commissar for Agriculture of Soviet Russia
 Alexander Tsiurupa – Bolshevik leader, Soviet statesman, Vice Chairman and, later, Chief of food of Soviet Russia
 Vasyl' Shakhrai – Bolshevik revolutionary
 Nikolai Podgorny, Chairman of the Presidium of the Supreme Soviet of the USSR (1965–1977)
 Zinovie Serdiuk, Deputy of the Supreme Soviet of the USSR, First Secretary of the Moldavian Communist Party
 Alexander Danieliuk-Stefanski – member of the Russian Social Democratic Labor Party
 Pyotr Shelest, Deputy Chairman of the Council of Ministers of the Soviet Union, Full member of the 22nd, 23rd, 24th Politburo.
 Alexei Kirichenko – Second Secretary of the Communist Party of the Soviet Union (17 December 1957 – 5 April 1960)
 Vladimir Ivashko – Soviet politician, briefly acting as General Secretary of the Communist Party of the Soviet Union. Deputy General Secretary of the Communist Party of the Soviet Union (1990–1991)
 Nikolai Demchenko – the first deputy commissar of agriculture of the USSR, People's Commissar of Grain and Livestock Farms of the USSR
 Stepan Chervonenko – Soviet ambassador to Peking
 Igor Gouzenko – cipher clerk for the Soviet embassy to Canada in Ottawa, Ontario
 Grigory Grinko – finance minister of the Soviet Union (1930–1937)
 Vlas Chubar – finance minister of the Soviet Union (1937–1938)
 Ivan Kazanets – the minister of ferrous metallurgy of the Soviet Union
 Vsevolod Murakhovsky – First Deputy Premier of the Soviet Union during the Gorbachev Era
 Vitaly Fedorchuk – KGB officer and Minister of Interior Affairs of the Soviet Union
 Nikolai Golushko – KGB officer and the director of the Federal Service of Counter-intelligence of the Russian Federation
 Stepan Chervonenko – Soviet ambassador to Peking
 Vladimir Chub – the governor of Rostov Oblast in Russia from 1991 until 2010
 Vitaly Mukha – politician, who served as the 1st and third Governor of Novosibirsk Oblast from 1991 to 1993 and from 1995 to 2000
 Sergey Kiriyenko (half Ukrainian) – Prime Minister of Russia
 Aleksandr Skorobogatko – billionaire businessman and former deputy member in the State Duma, having represented the Liberal Democratic Party of Russia (2003–2007) and United Russia (2007–2016)
 Georgy Poltavchenko – Former Governor of Saint Petersburg
 Viktor Khristenko – politician who was chairman of the board of the Eurasian Economic Commission (2012–2016);First Deputy Prime Minister of Russia (1999–2000);Minister of Industry (2004–2012)
 Sergei Aleksashenko - economist and former government official. He was the deputy finance minister and first deputy chairman of the board of the Central Bank of Russia from 1995 to 1998.
 Dmitry Kozak, the Deputy Prime Minister of Russia from 2008 to 2020, Deputy Kremlin Chief of Staff
 Alexander Novak – Deputy Prime Minister of Russia since 2020
 Sergey Kislyak – Russia's Ambassador to the United States (2008–2017)
 Sergey Shakhray – co-author of the Constitution of the Russian Federation
 Irina Yarovaya – Deputy Chairman of the State Duma from United Russia Party and a member of United Russia's General Council
 Anatoly Brovko – Russian politician who served as the Governor of Volgograd Oblast
 Viktoria Abramchenko - Deputy Prime Minister of the Russian Federation with responsibility for Agro-Industrial Complex, Natural Resources and Ecology.
 Vladimir Timoshenko – career diplomat and is a former ambassador of the Russian Federation to Benin
 Alexei Didenko – politician, deputy of the Tomsk Oblast Duma
 Aleksandr Drozdenko - economist and politician. He has been Governor of Leningrad Oblast since 28 May 2012.
 Andrey Andreychenko - member of the State Duma of the VII convocation between 31 May 2017 and 12 October 2021, and a member of the Legislative Assembly of Primorsky Krai of the VI convocation from 18 September 2016 to 24 May 2017.
 Andrey Ishchenko - politician who currently serves as a member of parliament in the Legislative Assembly of Primorsky Krai
 Yevgeny Nazdratenko - 2nd Governor of Primorsky Krai
 Oleg Kozhemyako - the Governor of Primorsky Krai since 2018. Previously he was the Governor of Sakhalin Oblast, Russia.
 Andrey Tarasenko - politician and former army officer who is currently the Chairman of the Government of the Republic of Sakha (Yakutia) since 31 July 2020
 Nikolai Kondratenko -politician, long time Governor of Krasnodar Krai, runner-up candidate of the Communist Party (CPRF) in 2003
 Igor Belchuk - politician and businessman who had served as the acting Governor of Primorsky Krai in spring 2001.
 Konstantin Chuychenko - politician, businessman, and lawyer who served as the Minister of Justice since 21 January 2020
 Dmitry Grigorenko (Russian: Дмитрий Юрьевич Григоренко; born 14 July 1978) is a Russian politician serving as Deputy Prime Minister of the Russian Federation and Chief of the Government Staff assumed office in January 2020
 Vitaly Mutko - politician who served as the Deputy Prime Minister of Russia from 2016 to 2020
 Mikhail Murashko - physician and a politician, serving as the Minister of Health of the Russian Federation since 21 January 2020
 Gennadiy Onishchenko - government official who was the Chief Sanitary Inspector of Russia from 1996 to 2013

 Dmitry Chernyshenko - businessman and politician serving as Deputy Prime Minister of Russia for Tourism, Sport, Culture and Communications since 2020
 Alexander Prokopchuk – employee of the internal affairs agencies, head of the Ministry of Internal Affairs of the Russian Federation National Central Bureau of Interpol from 14 June 2011, and vice-president of Interpol from 10 November 2016
 Alexey Overchuk - politician serving as Deputy Prime Minister of the Russian Federation from 21 January 2020
 Valery Limarenko - current Governor of Sakhalin Oblast, a federal subject of Russia from 2018
 Alexander Grushko - diplomat, and is currently Deputy Minister of Foreign Affairs, since 22 January 2018. Previously, he was the Permanent Representative of Russia to NATO, serving from 2012 to 2018.
 Vladimir Shumeyko - 1st Chairman of the Federation Council, First Deputy Prime Minister
 Vladimir Medinsky – Russia's Minister of Culture (2012–present)
 Natalia Poklonskaya - politician, diplomat, serving as deputy head of Rossotrudnichestvo since 2 February 2022
 Alexei Navalny -  Russian opposition leader, lawyer, and anti-corruption activist

Minister of Health of Soviet Union 
 Nikolai Semashko – Russian politician, organizer of the health system

Military figures 

 Petro Doroshenko – Hetman of Right-Bank Ukraine(1665–1672) and a Russian voevoda
 Alexander Lebed – late Lieutenant General of Russia, 1996 Presidential candidate (Ukrainian origin)
 Alexei Razumovsky – Field marshal of Russian Imperial Army
 Kirill Razumovski – Field marshal of Russian Imperial Army
 Nikolai Linevich – career military officer, General of Infantry (1903) and Adjutant general in the Imperial Russian Army in the Far East during the latter part of the Russo-Japanese War.
 Yuri Lysianskyi – officer in the Imperial Russian Navy and explorer
 Ivan Gudovich – Russian noble and military leader
 Vasily Zavoyko – an admiral in the Russian Imperial navy. In 1854, during the Crimean War, he led the successful defence against the Siege of Petropavlovsk by the allied British-French troops.
 Pavel Mishchenko - Imperial Russian career military officer and statesman of the Imperial Russian Army
 Ivan Grigorovich served as Imperial Russia's last Naval Minister from 1911 until the onset of the 1917 revolution.
 Roman Kondratenko- general in the Imperial Russian Army famous for his devout defense of Port Arthur during the Russo-Japanese War of 1904–1905
 Alexey Schastny – Russian naval commander during World War I
 Ivan Kozhedub – Soviet World War II fighter ace, considered to be the highest-scoring Soviet and Allied fighter pilot of World War II
 Pavel Rybalko – commander of armoured troops in the Red Army during and following World War II.
 Alexei Berest – Soviet political officer and one of the three Red Army soldiers who hoisted the Victory Banner
 Fedor Zinchenko – Soviet officer who commanded the 150th Rifle Division's 756th Regiment during the Storming of the Reichstag.
 Dmitry Lavrinenko – Soviet tank commander and Hero of the Soviet Union. He was the highest scoring tank ace of the Allies during World War II.
 Alexander Marinesko – Soviet naval officer and, during World War II, the captain of the submarine S-13 which sank the German military transport ship Wilhelm Gustloff. The most successful Soviet submarine commander in terms of gross register tonnage (GRT) sunk.
 Dmitry Lelyushenko, Soviet military commander, his final actions in 1945 involved directing forces during the Red Army's attacks on both Berlin and Prague.
 Kuzma Derevyanko – general of the Red Army. He was the representative of the Soviet Union at the ceremonial signing of the written agreement that established the armistice ending the Pacific War, and with it World War II
 Semyon Timoshenko – Marshal of the Soviet Union
 Andrey Yeryomenko – Soviet general during World War II and, subsequently, a Marshal of the Soviet Union
 Panteleimon Ponomarenko – a Soviet statesman and politician and one of the leaders of Soviet partisan resistance during WW2
 Alexander Utvenko - Red Army Lieutenant general.
 Fedir Dyachenko – Soviet sniper during World War II, credited with as many as 425 kills.
 Nikolai Pinchuk (pilot), Soviet fighter pilot and flying ace during World War II who totaled 20 solo and 2 shared aerial victories
 Kirill Moskalenko, marshal of the Soviet Union
 Ivan Taranenko – Soviet fighter pilot, flying ace, and regimental commander in World War II who went on to become a general
 Sergei Rudenko (general) – Soviet Marshal of the aviation
 Grigory Kulik, marshal of the Soviet Union
 Pyotr Koshevoy, Soviet military commander and a Marshal of the Soviet Union
 Alexei Burdeinei - Soviet general.
 Pavel Batitsky – Soviet military leader awarded the highest honorary title of Hero of the Soviet Union in 1965 and promoted to Marshal of the Soviet Union in 1968
 Ivan Moshlyak – Soviet major general who received the highest honorary title of Hero of the Soviet Union in 1938 for his heroism during the Battle of Lake Khasan
 Pyotr Gnido – Soviet fighter pilot during World War II who was credited with 34 solo and 6 shared aerial victories, and recipient of the title of Hero of Soviet Union
 Nikolay Dyatlenko – Soviet officer, interrogator and translator who was part of a team that attempted to deliver a message of truce (sometimes referred to as an "ultimatum") to the German Sixth Army at the Battle of Stalingrad in January 1943
 Grigory Kravchenko – test pilot who became a flying ace and twice Hero of the Soviet Union in Asia before the start of Operation Barbarossa
 Ivan Golubets – Soviet sailor with the Black Sea Fleet
 Vladimir Sudets – Soviet air commander during World War II, commanding the 17th Air Army, and later became Marshal of the aviation after the war
 Pyotr Vershigora – one of the leaders of the Soviet partisan movement in Ukraine, Belarus and Poland
 Pyotr Braiko – Soviet soldier during the Second World War who gained the status of Hero of the Soviet Union following the conflict
 Vasyl Herasymenko - Soviet military leader 
 Oleg Koshevoy - Soviet partisan and one of the founders of the clandestine organization Young Guard, which fought the Nazi forces in Krasnodon during World War II between 1941 and 1945
 Mikhail Tsiselsky – Soviet naval pilot during World War II who was awarded the title Hero of the Soviet Union
 Ivan Turkenich – Soviet partisan, one of the leaders of the underground anti-Nazi organization Young Guard, which operated in Krasnodon district during World War II between 1941 and 1944
 Dmitry Glinka (aviator) – Soviet flying ace during World War II who was twice awarded the title Hero of the Soviet Union for his achievements, having scored 50 individual aerial victories by the end of the war.
 Boris Glinka – Soviet flying ace during World War II with over 20 solo shootdowns.
 Vasily Mykhlik – Ilyushin Il-2 pilot and squadron commander in the 566th Assault Aviation Regiment of the Soviet Air Forces during the Second World War who was twice awarded the title Hero of the Soviet Union.
 Leonid Beda – ground-attack squadron commander in the Soviet Air Forces during the Second World War who went on to become a Lieutenant-General of Aviation.
 Pavel Dubinda – sergeant in the Red Army during World War II and one of only four people that was both a full bearer of the Order of Glory and Hero of the Soviet Union
 Nikolai Simoniak – General in the Soviet Army during World War II
 Yuri Shvets – KGB officer
 Yepifan Kovtyukh – Soviet corps commander
 Sergey Sheyko – Hero of the Russian Federation, is a colonel in Russian Naval Infantry
 Boris Dumenko – Red Army commander during the Russian Civil War
 Alexander Kravchenko (revolutionary) – revolutionary, agronomist and partisan who fought against Admiral Kolchak's White forces in Siberia in 1919 during the Russian Civil War
 Grigory Skiruta – WWII Red Army officer
 Zakhar Slyusarenko – WWII tank officer and brigade commander, twice awarded the title Hero of the Soviet Union
 Bogdan Stashinsky – KGB officer and spy who assassinated the Ukrainian nationalist leaders in the late 1950s
 Ivan Stepanenko – Soviet WWII flying ace with over 30 solo victories

 Vladimir Sudets – Soviet WWII air commander, later marshal of aviation
 Pavel Sudoplatov – secret police officer, lieutenant general of the MVD
 Stepan Suprun – Soviet test pilot who tested over 140 aircraft types during his career
 Pavel Taran – WWII Il-4 pilot, twice awarded the title Hero of the Soviet Union
 Ivan Taranenko – Soviet WWII fighter ace, later a general
 Sergey Tereshchenko – Prime Minister of Kazakhstan (1991–1994)
 Semyon Timoshenko – Marshal of the Soviet Union
 Grigory Tkhor – Soviet aviator, Spanish Civil War and Second Sino-Japanese War volunteer, and major general of the Soviet Air Force
 Sergei Trofimenko – Soviet military commander, active in the Russian Civil War and Second World War
 Mikhail Tsiselsky – Soviet WWII naval pilot, awarded the title Hero of the Soviet Union
 Ivan Turkenich – Soviet partisan, a leaders of the anti-Nazi Young Guard during WWII
 Yelena Ubiyvovk – WWII partisan and leader of a Komsomol cell
 Nina Ulyanenko – navigator, pilot and flight commander in the women's 46th Taman Guards Night Bomber Aviation Regiment
 Nikolai Usenko – Red Army soldier, Hero of the Soviet Union
 Nikolai Semeyko – Soviet Il-2 pilot and navigator during World War II who was twice awarded the title Hero of the Soviet Union.
 Grigory Vakulenchuk – sailor, organizer, and leader of the uprising on the Russian battleship Potemkin
 Pyotr Vershigora – Soviet partisan leader in Ukraine, Belarus and Poland
 Andrey Vitruk – Soviet Air Force general
 Polina Osipenko - Soviet military pilot
 Timofei  Strokach - prominent military figure of the Soviet NKVD and KGB
 IlyaTimofei Amvrosievich Strokach (Russian: Тимофей Амвросиевич Строкач; Ukrainian: Тимофій Амвросійович Строкач, Tymofiy Strokach; 4 March 1903 – 15 August 1963) was a prominent military figure of the Soviet NKVD and KGB. Vlasenko – political commissar in the Red Army from WWII
 Oleg Ostapenko – the former director of Roscosmos, the federal space agency, retired Colonel General in the Russian Military, former Deputy Minister of Defence, and former commander of the Aerospace Defence Forces
 Vladimir Sergeyevich Vysotsky – Russian admiral and Commander of the Russian Northern Fleet
 Viktor Yanukovych – fourth President of Ukraine
 Viktor Yanukovych Jr – Ukrainian politician and Member of Parliament
 Nikolai Yegipko – Soviet Navy officer, Hero of the Soviet Union
 Iosif Apanasenko – Soviet division commander
 Fyodor Kostenko – Soviet corps and army commander
 Ivan Drachenko – Soviet Il-2 pilot and the only aviator awarded both the title Hero of the Soviet Union and been a full bearer of the Order of Glory.
 Andrey Yeryomenko – Soviet general during World War II
 Vitaly Zakharchenko – Former Minister of Internal Affairs of Ukraine
 Yekaterina Zelenko – WWII Soviet Su-2 pilot, flew during Winter War
 Yakov Cherevichenko – Soviet military leader and colonel general
 Stepan Artyomenko – the commander of a battalion of the 447th Rifle Regiment in the Red Army during the Second World War, who was twice awarded the title Hero of the Soviet Union
 Ivan Boyko – the commander of the 69th Guards Tank Regiment and later the 64th Guards Tank Brigade during World War II; he was twice awarded the title Hero of the Soviet Union for his successful combat leadership
 Ivan Zaporozhets – Soviet security officer and official of the OGPU-NKVD
 Vasily Zavoyko – Russian admiral, successfully defended against the Siege of Petropavlovsk
 Yevgeniya Zhigulenko – WWII Soviet Air Force pilot and navigator, Hero of the Soviet Union
 Filipp Zhmachenko – Soviet Army general, Hero of the Soviet Union
 Irina Levchenko - medic turned tank officer in the Red Army during World War II who was awarded the title Hero of the Soviet Union in 1965; she was also the first Soviet woman awarded the Florence Nightingale Medal
 Aleksandra Samusenko - Soviet T-34 tank commander and a liaison officer during World War II
 Aleksandra Boiko - tank commander in the Soviet Army active in the Eastern Front of the Second World War
 Fedor Zinchenko – Soviet officer who commanded the regiment that placed the Victory Banner during the Storming of the Reichstag.
 Fyodor Zozulya – admiral of the Soviet Navy
 Georgy Zozulya – WWII ground-attack pilot in the Soviet Air Force
 Andrei Girich – Soviet Air Force major general and Hero of the Soviet Union
 Andrei Paliy - naval officer who served as the deputy commander of the Black Sea Fleet
 Aleksandr Chaiko  - army officer who is currently the commander of the Eastern Military District since 12 November 2021
 Aleksandr Golovko - colonel general in the Russian military and commander of the Russian Space Forces since 1 August 2015
 Valery Solodchuk - officer of the Russian Army
 Sergei Pinchuk - officer of the Russian Navy, currently holds the rank of vice-admiral, and is deputy commander in chief of the Black Sea Fleet

Business 
 Oleksiy Alchevsky – industrialist, established the first finance group in Russia.
 Viktor Bout – arms dealer
 Leonid Fedun – billionaire businessman
 Yury Kovalchuk - billionaire businessman and financier who is "reputed to be Vladimir Putin's personal banker"
 Gennady Timchenko - oligarch and billionaire businessman
 Alexander Ponomarenko -  billionaire businessman who made his fortune in banking, sea ports, commercial real estate and airport construction
 Andrey Melnichenko - billionaire entrepreneur
 Serhiy Kurchenko – businessman and founder/owner of the group of companies "Gas Ukraine 2009" specializing in trading of liquefied natural gas. Kurchenko is also the former owner and president of FC Metalist Kharkiv and the Ukrainian Media Holding group.Since 2014 lives in Russia.
 Dmitry Gerasimenko – businessman, industrialist
 Vladimir Ivanenko – businessman, founded first private cable and television network in USSR
 Artur Kirilenko – entrepreneur, property developer
 Sergei Magnitsky – Ukrainian-born Russian tax advisor and prisoner
 Viktor Petrik – businessman
 Petro Prokopovych – founder of commercial beekeeping and the inventor of the first movable frame hive
 Vladimir Kovalevsky – statesman, scientist and entrepreneur
 Boris Kamenka – entrepreneur and banker in the Russian Empire. He was one of the richest people in Russia before the Russian Revolution.

Other 

 Nina Kukharchuk-Khrushcheva – First Lady of USSR, second wife of Nikita Khrushchev
 Lyudmyla Nastenko-Yanukovych – First Lady of Ukraine
 Raisa Titarenko-Gorbacheva  – First Lady of USSR, wife of Mikhail Gorbachev

See also 
 Demographics of Russia
 Ukrainian diaspora
 Russians in Ukraine
 Ukrainians in Siberia

References

Footnotes

Sources 
 
 Українське козацтво - Енциклопедія - Kyiv, 2006
 
 
 
 Польовий Р. Кубанська Україна К. Дiокор 2003.
 
 Сергійчук В. Українізація Росії К. 2000
 Internet site for Ukrainians in Russia
 Зав'ялов А. В. Соціальна адаптація українських іммігрантів : монографія / А. В. Зав'ялов. — Київ : Саміт-книга, 2020. — 180 с.
 Завьялов А. В. Социальная адаптация украинских иммигрантов : монография / А. В. Завьялов. – Иркутск : Изд-во ИГУ, 2017. – 179 с.

External links 
 Races of Europe 1942–1943 
 Hammond's Racial map of Europe 1923 
 Peoples of Europe / Die Voelker Europas 1914 
 Ethnographic map of Europe 1914 
 Ukrainians of Russia by number, sex and share in the population structure, 1926–2010 censuses 
 Ukrainian language knowledge in Russia by ethnic groups 
 Ukrainians of Russia by their native language, 2010 
 Ukrainians of Russia by languages knowledge, 2002, 2010 
 Distribution of the Ukrainian population of Russia by age and sex, 2010 
 Завьялов А. В. Социальная адаптация украинских иммигрантов : монография / А. В. Завьялов. – Иркутск : Изд-во ИГУ, 2017. – 179 с. (tables The Ukrainian language knowledge by Russian regions, 2010 и Ukrainians in the population structure of Russian regions, 1897–2010) 

Russia
Ethnic groups in Russia
+Russia